The 1990 Melbourne Cup was a two-mile handicap horse race which took place on Tuesday, 6 November 1990.

The race was won by Kingston Rule who was sired by 1973 American Triple Crown winner Secretariat and was out of Rose of Kingston who won VRC Oaks and Australian Derby in 1982. Kingston Rule lost his first race in Australia by 35 lengths when he was trained by Tommy Smith. He was transferred to the stable of Bart Cummings who trained him as a stayer. In 1990 Kingston Rule won Moonee Valley Gold Cup and Lexus Stakes before the Cup. Starting a 7/1 equal favourite with The Phantom and ridden by Darren Beadman Kingston Rule beat The Phantom and finished the 3200 meters in a record time of 3:16.30 which still stands.

Field 

This is a list of horses which ran in the 1990 Melbourne Cup.

References

1990
Melbourne Cup
Melbourne Cup
1990s in Melbourne